Martin Hayter Short  (born March 26, 1950) is a Canadian actor, comedian, and writer. He has received various awards including two Primetime Emmy Awards, and a Tony Award. Short was awarded as an Officer of the Order of Canada in 2019.

He is known for his work on the television programs SCTV and Saturday Night Live. Short created the characters Jiminy Glick and Ed Grimley. He also acted in the sitcom Mulaney (2014–2015), the variety series Maya & Marty (2016), and The Morning Show (2019). He has also had an active career on stage, starring in Broadway productions including Neil Simon's musicals The Goodbye Girl (1993) and Little Me (1998–1999). The latter earned him a Tony Award for Best Actor in a Musical and the former a nomination in the same category.

He has starred in comedy films such as Three Amigos (1986), Innerspace (1987), Three Fugitives (1989), Captain Ron (1992), Clifford (1994), Mars Attacks! (1996), Jungle 2 Jungle (1997), and The Santa Clause 3: The Escape Clause (2006). Short also provided voice-work for films like The Pebble and the Penguin (1995), The Prince of Egypt (1998), Treasure Planet (2002), 101 Dalmatians II: Patch's London Adventure (2003), The Spiderwick Chronicles (2008), Madagascar 3: Europe's Most Wanted, Frankenweenie (both 2012), and The Wind Rises (2013).

In 2015, Short started touring nationally with fellow comedian Steve Martin. In 2018, they released their Netflix special An Evening You Will Forget for the Rest of Your Life for which they received three Primetime Emmy Award nominations. Since 2021, he has co-starred in the Hulu comedy series Only Murders in the Building alongside Martin and Selena Gomez. For his performance he has earned nominations for the Primetime Emmy Award, the Golden Globe Award, the Screen Actors Guild Award, and the Critics Choice Television Award.

Early life
Short was born on March 26, 1950, in Hamilton, Ontario, the youngest of five children of Olive Grace (née Hayter; 1913–1968), a concertmistress of the Hamilton Symphony Orchestra, and Charles Patrick Short (1909–1970), a corporate executive with Stelco, a Canadian steel company. He and his siblings were raised as Catholics. He had three older brothers, David (now deceased), Michael, and Brian, and one older sister, Nora. Short's father was an Irish Catholic emigrant from Crossmaglen, South Armagh in the north of Ireland, who came to North America as a stowaway during the Irish War of Independence. Short's mother was of English and Irish descent. She encouraged his early creative endeavours. His eldest brother, David, was killed in a car accident in Montréal in 1962 when Short was 12. His mother died of cancer in 1968, his father two years later of complications from a stroke.

Short attended Westdale Secondary School and graduated from McMaster University with a Bachelor of Arts degree in Social Work in 1971.

Career

Early career
When Short graduated from McMaster University, he intended to pursue a career in social work; however, he became interested in acting once he was cast in a Toronto production of Godspell that same year. Among other members of that production's cast were Victor Garber, Gilda Radner, Eugene Levy, Dave Thomas, and Andrea Martin; Paul Shaffer was the musical director. Short stated in the documentary Love, Gilda that he and Gilda Radner dated each other on and off during that time.

He was subsequently cast in several television shows and plays, including the drama Fortune and Men's Eyes (1972). He worked solely in Canada through 1979. In 1979, Short starred in the US sitcom The Associates about a group of young novice lawyers working at a Wall Street law firm. In 1980, he joined the cast of I'm a Big Girl Now, a sitcom starring Diana Canova and Danny Thomas. Canova was offered the sitcom because of her success playing Corinne Tate Flotsky on ABC's Soap and left Soap shortly before Short's newlywed wife Nancy Dolman joined it.

Second City Television

Short was encouraged to pursue comedy by McMaster classmates Eugene Levy and Dave Thomas, whom he joined in the improvisation group The Second City in Toronto, Ontario, in 1977. He came to public notice when the group produced a show for television, Second City Television (SCTV), which ran for several years in Canada, then the United States. Short appeared on SCTV in 1982–83. At SCTV, Short developed several characters before moving on to Saturday Night Live for the 1984–85 season:

 Aged songwriter Irving Cohen, commonly thought to be loosely based on American composers Irving Caesar and/or Irving Berlin and perhaps Canadian songwriter Leonard Cohen, but actually (according to Short in his autobiography) inspired by Sophie Tucker
 Defense attorney Nathan Thurm
 Albino Vegas singer, Jackie Rogers Jr. and his father, Jackie Rogers Sr., the latter of which was mauled to death by a mountain lion during a comeback special that took place in the woods.
 Oddball man-child Ed Grimley, later featured on SNL and in his own short-lived animated television series entitled The Completely Mental Misadventures of Ed Grimley. The show, which was produced by Hanna-Barbera and aired for a single season in fall 1988, is the only animated series adapted from an SCTV character and a Saturday Night Live character to date.

Saturday Night Live
Short joined Saturday Night Live (SNL) for the 1984–85 season. He helped revive the show with his many characters for season ten (the last one produced by Dick Ebersol). "Short's appearance on SNL helped to revive the show's fanbase, which had flagged after the departure of Eddie Murphy, and in turn, would launch his successful career in films and television." His SNL characters included numerous holdovers from his SCTV days, most notably, his Ed Grimley character, depicted on Saturday Night Live as a geeky everyman who is obsessed with Wheel of Fortune, plays the triangle, and often finds himself in bizarre situations rather than a miscast bad actor in several film and TV show parodies (The Completely Mental Misadventures of Ed Grimley used the SNL characterization of him rather than the SCTV take on him). He also did impressions of such celebrities as Jerry Lewis and Katharine Hepburn.

Since then he has made multiple appearances on the show including on the Saturday Night Live 40th Anniversary Special in 2015.

Television
In addition to his work on SCTV and SNL, Short has starred in several television specials and series of his own. In 1985, Short starred in the one-hour Showtime special Martin Short: Concert for the North Americas. This was Short's first live concert, interspersed with studio sketches and a wraparound featuring Jackie Rogers Jr. Co-produced by the CBC, this aired as The Martin Short Comedy Special in Canada in March 1986. In 1989, Short headlined another one-hour comedy special, this time for HBO, I, Martin Short, Goes Hollywood, Short's classic send-up of all things Hollywood. It featured many of his characters including Ed Grimley and Jackie Rogers Jr.

Short has had three television shows called The Martin Short Show, including a sitcom, The Martin Short Show, 1994; a sketch comedy show, The Show Formerly Known as the Martin Short Show, 1995; and a syndicated talk show The Martin Short Show, which ran from 1999 to 2000.

Short starred as Jiminy Glick on Comedy Central's Primetime Glick (2001–2003). He interviewed performers and celebrities as the character Jiminy Glick. The New York Times in 2002 referred to the character as "the most unpredictable and hilariously uninhibited comic creation to hit TV since Bart Simpson was in diapers."

In addition to his own series, Short has guest starred on several shows including Arrested Development (episode titled "Ready, Aim, Marry Me", 2005), Muppets Tonight (1996), Law & Order: Special Victims Unit, and Weeds. He joined the FX drama Damages as lawyer Leonard Winstone in 2010.

Short voiced the Cat in the Hat in the animated TV series The Cat in the Hat Knows a Lot About That!, which aired from 2010 to 2013. He later voiced the character in a number of related TV specials in 2014 and 2016.

He shot a new comedy special for television in Toronto in September 2011. The special, I, Martin Short, Goes Home follows his return to his native Hamilton, Ontario and has a cast that includes Eugene Levy, Andrea Martin, Joe Flaherty, and Fred Willard. The special aired on CBC Television on April 3, 2012, and garnered Short a nomination for Best Lead Actor in a Comedy Program or Series at the 1st Canadian Screen Awards. In 2011, Short joined the cast of How I Met Your Mother for its seventh season, playing Marshall's manic boss and was a judge on the first season of Canada's Got Talent (2012).

He, along with Steve Martin and Chevy Chase appeared on an episode of Saturday Night Live as part of the "Five-Timers Club", on March 9, 2013, which included those actors who had hosted the show five or more times. However, Short appeared as a waiter, as he had only hosted three times.

From 2014 to 2015, he starred in the Fox sitcom Mulaney, as Lou Cannon, the boss and the game show host of the title character John Mulaney.

On May 31, 2016, Short debuted a new variety show on NBC, Maya & Marty, which also starred Maya Rudolph.

His most recent credit is Only Murders in the Building, a Hulu comedy series, in which he stars and executive produces alongside Steve Martin and Selena Gomez. The show was nominated for a 2021 Peabody Award, and in July 2022, he received his 13th Emmy nomination for his role in Only Murders in the Building.

Film
After doing sketch comedy for several years, Short starred in Three Amigos, Innerspace, The Big Picture, Captain Ron, Clifford, Three Fugitives (1989), directed by Francis Veber, with Nick Nolte and James Earl Jones; he was the memorable scene-stealing character "Franck" in the 1991 remake of Father of the Bride and its sequel; and in Pure Luck (1991), directed by Nadia Tass, with Danny Glover and Sheila Kelley.

In 1996, he appeared in Tim Burton's sci-fi comedy Mars Attacks! as lascivious Press Secretary Jerry Ross. In 1997, he appeared as Wall Street broker Richard Kempster in Jungle 2 Jungle, with Tim Allen.

In 2004, he wrote and starred in Jiminy Glick in Lalawood with Jan Hooks as his wife, Dixie Glick. In 2006, he starred in another film with Tim Allen, The Santa Clause 3: The Escape Clause.

Short also provided the voices of several animated film characters, such as Stubbs in We're Back! A Dinosaur's Story, Hubie in The Pebble and the Penguin, Huy in The Prince of Egypt, Ooblar in Jimmy Neutron: Boy Genius, B.E.N. in Treasure Planet, Preminger in Barbie as the Princess and the Pauper, Thimbletack the Brownie in The Spiderwick Chronicles, Stefano the sea lion in Madagascar 3: Europe's Most Wanted, Kurokawa in the English dub of Hayao Miyazaki's The Wind Rises, and The Jester in Legends of Oz: Dorothy's Return.

Short was the host of the defunct Walt Disney World attractions O Canada!, a Circle-Vision 360° film in the Epcot theme park's Canada pavilion, and "The Making of Me" at Epcot's Wonders of Life pavilion, a 15-minute film about how pregnancy occurs.

Short starred in the Netflix original The Willoughbys (2020) as the impolite father.

Stage
Short resumed work in the theatre, playing a lead role in the 1993 musical version of the Neil Simon film The Goodbye Girl, on Broadway, receiving a Tony Award nomination and an Outer Critics Circle Award. He had the lead role in the 1999 Broadway revival of the musical Little Me, for which he received a Tony Award and another Outer Critics Circle Award.

In 2003, Short took to the stage once again in the critically acclaimed Los Angeles run of The Producers. Short played the role of the accountant, Leo Bloom, opposite Jason Alexander's Max Bialystock. Although the role of Leo Bloom was originated on Broadway by Matthew Broderick, Mel Brooks first approached Short about doing the part opposite Nathan Lane. On the subject, Short has stated in numerous interviews that, while he was thrilled by the opportunity, the idea of having to move his family from their Los Angeles home to New York for a year was less than ideal and ultimately proved a deal-breaker.

Short performed in his satirical one-man show, with a cast of six, Martin Short: Fame Becomes Me, at the Bernard B. Jacobs Theatre on Broadway. The show toured several cities in the spring of 2006, prior to opening on Broadway in August 2006; the show closed in January 2007. In it, he performed his classic characters Grimley, Cohen, and Glick.

As Glick, Short brought a member of the audience (usually a celebrity) on stage and interviewed him or her. Jerry Seinfeld was the guest on opening night. The show also featured parodies of many celebrities including Celine Dion, Katharine Hepburn, Elizabeth Taylor and Richard Burton, Tommy Tune, Joan Rivers, Britney Spears, Ellen DeGeneres, Renée Zellweger, Jodie Foster, Rachael Ray, and Short's wife, actress Nancy Dolman. The cast album was released on April 10, 2007, and is available from Ghostlight Records, an imprint of Sh-K-Boom Records.

Short has continued to tour in his one-man show, which features many of his best-loved characters and sketches. In addition to Fame Becomes Me, some titles that Short has used for his one-man show include Stroke Me Lady Fame, If I'd Saved, I Wouldn't Be Here, and Sunday in the Park with George Michael. Short's memoir, covering his 40-year career in show business, I Must Say: My Life as a Humble Comedy Legend, was released on November 4, 2014.

Since 2015, Short has toured with fellow comedian Steve Martin. Together their tours have included A Very Stupid Conversation in 2015, An Evening You Will Forget for the Rest of Your Life in 2017, and The Funniest Show in Town at the Moment in 2021. With their 2017 tour, it was filmed for Netflix as a special and was nominated for three Primetime Emmy Awards.

Personal life

Family

Short met Canadian comic actress Nancy Dolman in 1972 during the run of Godspell. The couple married in 1980. Dolman retired from show business in 1985 to be a stay-at-home mother and raise their family. Short and Dolman adopted three children: Katherine, Oliver, and Henry. Dolman died of ovarian cancer on August 21, 2010.

Short and his family make their home in Pacific Palisades, Los Angeles. He also has a home on Lake Rosseau in Ontario. He is a naturalized US citizen.

Short has two stars on Canada's Walk of Fame. His brother, Michael, is a comedy writer and twice winner of the Emmy Award for comedy sketch writing.

Extended family
Nancy Dolman's brother, screenwriter/director Bob Dolman (who served as a part of SCTVs Emmy-winning writing team alongside Short), married their close friend and colleague Andrea Martin, also in 1980. Short is uncle to the couple's two sons, Jack and Joe. Bob Dolman and Andrea Martin have since divorced (2004). Short is a first cousin of Clare Short, a former member of the British Parliament and former British cabinet minister.

Philanthropy
Short appeared in a 2001 episode on the Celebrity Who Wants to Be a Millionaire hosted by Regis Philbin, winning $32,000 for his charity, Loyola High School.

Short has actively campaigned for the Women's Research Cancer Fund, and he accepted a "Courage Award" on behalf of his late wife at a 2011 gala by the group.

Short is also a member of the Canadian charity Artists Against Racism.

Sports fandom
Short is an avid fan of his hometown team, the Hamilton Tiger-Cats of the Canadian Football League.

Filmography

Film

Television

Comedy specials

Video games

Theatre

Awards and honours 

Over the course of Short's prolific career in film, television and theatre, Short has received various nominations. He received two Tony Award nominations, winning for Little Me in 1999. Short also has received twelve Primetime Emmy Award nominations, winning twice for Outstanding Writing for a Variety Series for SCTV (1983), and AFI Life Achievement award: Mel Brooks (2014). In 2014 Short 
received the Robert Altman Award from Independent Spirit Awards alongside the cast of Paul Thomas Anderson's Inherent Vice.

Short has received various honours from his birthplace of Canada, including in 1994, being appointed a Member of the Order of Canada. In 1995, Short received the Earl Grey Lifetime Achievement Award. In 1999, he earned the Sir Peter Ustinov Award at the Banff Television Festival.
Short was honoured with a star on Canada's Walk of Fame in 2000. In 2015, a stamp of Short was issued by Canada Post. In 2016, he received the Canadian Screen Awards Lifetime Achievement Award. In 2019 Short became an Officer of the Order of Canada. In 2001 Short was awarded an honorary Doctor of Literature from McMaster University. Short has also received Medals from Queen Elizabeth II, including in 2002 the Queen Elizabeth II Golden Jubilee Medal and in 2012 the Queen Elizabeth II Diamond Jubilee Medal.

Bibliography
 I Must Say: My Life as a Humble Comedy Legend (2014, autobiography)

References

External links

 in 2004
 
 
 
 Martin Short, Steve Martin, Chevy Chase interviewed in Austin about The Three Amigos in 1986 from Texas Archive of the Moving Image
 Martin Short interviewed by Roy Faires KVUE Austin about his new movie Innerspace (1987) from Texas Archive of the Moving Image.

1950 births
Living people
20th-century Canadian comedians
20th-century Canadian male actors
21st-century American comedians
21st-century American male actors
21st-century American male writers
21st-century American memoirists
21st-century American non-fiction writers
21st-century Canadian male actors
21st-century Canadian male writers
21st-century Canadian non-fiction writers
American impressionists (entertainers)
American male comedians
American male film actors
American male musical theatre actors
American male non-fiction writers
American male stage actors
American male television actors
American male video game actors
American male voice actors
American people of English descent
American people of Irish descent
American sketch comedians
American television personalities
Audiobook narrators
Canada's Got Talent judges
Canadian expatriate male actors in the United States
Canadian impressionists (entertainers)
Canadian male comedians
Canadian male film actors
Canadian male musical theatre actors
Canadian male non-fiction writers
Canadian male stage actors
Canadian male television actors
Canadian male video game actors
Canadian male voice actors
Canadian memoirists
Canadian people of English descent
Canadian people of Irish descent
Canadian Screen Award winners
Canadian sketch comedians
Canadian television personalities
Comedians from Ontario
Male actors from Hamilton, Ontario
McMaster University alumni
Officers of the Order of Canada
People with acquired American citizenship
Primetime Emmy Award winners
Tony Award winners
Writers from Hamilton, Ontario